The Vietnamese National U17 Football Championship, is the national championship of association football for male players under the age of 17 organized by Vietnam Football Federation(VFF).

Results

Top-performing clubs

Awards

References

External links
VPF
Giải bóng đá QG U17 - Cúp báo Bóng Đá 2006

Football leagues in Vietnam
Youth football in Vietnam